Miles Field was a baseball park in the northwest United States, located in Medford, Oregon, It hosted high school, American Legion, and minor league teams from 1948 to 2004.

The professional teams that played at this facility included the Medford Nuggets/Rogues of the Far West League in 1948–1951 and three Northwest League teams, the Medford Giants in 1967 and 1968, the Rogue Valley/Medford Dodgers from 1969 to 1971, and the Medford/Southern Oregon A's – Southern Oregon Timberjacks franchise from 1979 through 1999.

History 

In 1951, local auto dealer Claude "Shorty" Miles (1887–1968) worked behind the scenes to help get a new baseball park built in Medford because of his unbridled passion for the sport.  A suspicious fire destroyed the structure in early July, but it was quickly rebuilt.  Originally known as Jackson County Baseball Park, it was rededicated as "Miles Field" in June 1969, eight months after his death 

It was known as "Jackson & Perkins Gardens at Miles Field" during the mid to late 1990s, because of the ballpark's relationship with Bear Creek Corporation, now the Harry & David Corporation.

At the south end of the city, Miles Field was a block north of Garfield Street, between Highway 99 and Interstate 5.

Demise of the stadium 
After 21 seasons at the venue, the Timberjacks left Medford in October 1999 for British Columbia and became the Vancouver Canadians, leaving the city without a pro baseball franchise.  The field continued with use by high school and American Legion teams, and despite efforts to both raise funds to remodel the stadium and to bring in a new team to play there. It was torn down in 2004 to make way for a controversial new Walmart Super Center that was delayed and eventually opened in 2012.

In 2006, Harry & David Field was constructed just down the street from the old Miles Field site.  Under an agreement between the venue and the city of Medford, that field was built to accommodate youth, high school, and American Legion baseball, but not a professional team.

The Miles Field site remained empty and unoccupied due to the legal battle over the site which involved the Medford City Council, Walmart, and the Medford Citizens for Responsible Development.  In 2009, the Oregon Land Use Board of Appeals ruled to block the project temporarily on June 4 until a traffic study was prepared.  The city council appealed that ruling soon after.

However, despite the MCRD's best efforts to block construction, the Oregon Supreme Court ruled in favor of Walmart in 2010 on November 18, and the new Supercenter got the go-ahead to be built.  The court overturned a decision by the state's Land Use Board of Appeals to do a traffic  Construction started on the new Walmart in early 2012 and was completed that summer. A plaque commemorating Miles and the field are in a small courtyard just outside the

See also
 Nettleton Stadium
 Arcata Ball Park
 Harry & David Field
 Kiger Stadium
 Tiger Field
 Appeal-Democrat Park

References

External links 
 Southern Oregon Timberjacks year-by-year records, statistics and rosters at The Baseball Cube
 Northwest League Team History (1990–1997)
 Northwest League Team History (1998–2005)
 Miles Field pictures at Charlie's Ball Parks website
 Timberjacks go north; owner courts replacement Medford Mail Tribune (October 27, 1999)

Sports in Medford, Oregon
1951 establishments in Oregon
Defunct baseball venues in the United States
Defunct minor league baseball venues
Baseball venues in Oregon
2004 disestablishments in Oregon
Demolished sports venues in Oregon
Sports venues completed in 1951
Sports venues demolished in 2004